The Thirteenth Hour (aka:The 13th Hour) is a 1927 American silent film mystery produced and distributed by Metro Goldwyn Mayer and directed by Chester Franklin. The film stars Lionel Barrymore in a role where, as noted criminologist Professor Leroy, he dons a weird series of disguises to hide a dark secret.  This was the first film where Barrymore was cast opposite talented dogs, and the first where he was cast as a serial killer.

A print of this film survives in 16mm.

Plot
Junior detective Gray (Charles Delaney) discovers that the eccentric criminologist Professor Leroy (Lionel Barrymore) is both a crook and a murderer. A German Shepherd chases the elusive LeRoy throughout a large house filled with secret rooms.

Cast
 Lionel Barrymore as Professor Leroy
 Jacqueline Gadsdon as Mary Lyle
 Charles Delaney as Matt Gray
 Fred Kelsey as Detective Shaw
 Polly Moran as Polly
 Napoleon the Dog  as the dog
 Sojin

See also
Lionel Barrymore filmography
One Exciting Night
The Monster
The Bat
The Cat and the Canary
The Old Dark House

References

External links

 

The 13th Hour at Silent Era
Screen cap of Lionel Barrymore in the film
French pressbook(archived)

1927 films
1927 horror films
American silent feature films
Films directed by Chester Franklin
American black-and-white films
1920s American films
Silent horror films
American horror films